Lumsden is a town in the Qu'Appelle Valley in south central Saskatchewan, Canada, 31 km northwest of the city of Regina. It is surrounded by the Rural Municipality of Lumsden No. 189. The town functions as both a farming community and an unofficial suburb of Regina. Lumsden has an active artistic community, which consists of many writers, painters and sculptors.

History
Settlers first arrived in 1881 and the area came to be commonly known as Happy Hollow. When the Qu'Appelle, Long Lake and Saskatchewan Railway came through the community in 1889, the name was changed to Lumsden after Hugh Lumsden, a senior engineer with the railroad.

The town has been repeatedly flooded, with major flood events occurring in 1892, 1904, 1916, 1948, and 1969. In 1974, Lumsden experienced the highest water levels in the town's history; volunteers from Regina and all surrounding communities came to help with sandbagging. The town subsequently straightened the Qu'Appelle River's channel and built dikes. The Town was at risk for flooding again in 2011 after a wet fall winter of record snowfall; however, it did not flood.

The community was chosen by Harrowsmith Magazine in 2002 as the "prettiest" town in the province.

Centennial 
Official town centennial celebrations were held in March 2005. In May 2005, Lumsden hosted Queen Elizabeth II and The Duke of Edinburgh at the Lumsden Sports Centre. Hundreds of guests were entertained by Marny Duncan-Cary, the Lumsden Community Choir, the Riel Reelers, and the Lumsden & District Band and Jazz Ensemble. The event was held in celebration of both the town and the province's centenaries, and was the only engagement of Canada's Queen outside urban centres on that visit to Saskatchewan.

Demographics 

Climate

Community events

Lumsden Duck Derby 
Each year since 1987, the Duck Derby Committee hosts a fundraiser in which thousands of numbered plastic ducks are raced down the Qu'Appelle River. Participants purchase a numbered duck which is entered in the race, and the first ducks across the finish line win their owners cash and prizes. Proceeds from the derby benefit the Lumsden Sports Center (rink) in town. The Duck Derby also hosts a variety of artists, musicians, traders, etc. who perform and sell their wares in town.

Lumsden Scarecrow Festival 
The Town of Lumsden hosts an annual Scarecrow Festival in September. Events of the day include a large street market, hay rides, activities for kids, food vendors, garage sales, outdoor movie and fireworks. The event usually draws thousands of people to town.

Sports history 
In 2006, the Lumsden Arena became the site of the second edition of the Western Women's Hockey League championship, between the Calgary Oval X-Treme and the Minnesota Whitecaps. The town frequently hosts games for the Saskatchewan Prairie Ice, now of the Western Women's Hockey League.

The Lumsden Monarchs are a senior men's ice hockey team that was a founding member of the Highway Hockey League in central Saskatchewan in 1965.

Notable people
Illingworth Kerr - Artist (20 August 1905 – 6 January 1989)
 Edith Fowke - Canadian folklorist (April 30, 1913 - 28 March 1996); born in Lumsden.
Tanner Glass - NHL Hockey Player; graduated from Lumsden High School.
Joe Fafard, died in Lumsden in 2019
John Cullen Nugent, artist (1921-2014)

References

External links 

 

Towns in Saskatchewan
Lumsden No. 189, Saskatchewan
Division No. 6, Saskatchewan